Thomas N'Kono (born 20 July 1956) is a Cameroonian former professional footballer. One of the greatest goalkeepers from the continent of Africa, he was mainly associated with Espanyol, whom he represented for almost a decade playing more than 300 official matches.

N'Kono appeared for the Cameroon national team in three World Cups, and four Africa Cup of Nations tournaments.

Playing career

Club
N'Kono was born in Dizangue. After playing in his country with Canon Yaoundé and Tonnerre Yaoundé he moved to Spain with RCD Español in 1982, after solid performances in the FIFA World Cup played in that country; he received the France Football African Footballer of the Year award in that year, and also in 1979.

N'Kono hardly ever missed a game while with the Catalans, going on to make 333 competitive appearances. In the 1988–89 season, however, he was not able to help prevent the team's La Liga relegation, and was eventually replaced by Vicente Biurrun.

N'Kono would play three more years in Spain, incidentally also in Catalonia, with CE Sabadell FC (Segunda División) and CE L'Hospitalet. He retired in his 40s at Club Bolívar from Bolivia, and subsequently returned to his main club as a goalkeeping coach, helping develop young talent and countryman Carlos Kameni.

N'Kono placed second in IFFHS' "African Goalkeeper of the Century" elections, behind Joseph-Antoine Bell.

International
A Cameroonian international for almost two decades, N'Kono played in three World Cups: 1982, 1990 and 1994. In the first two he was the starter, as the nation went out in the group stage without losing a match and exited in the quarter-final against England, respectively. 

The 37-year-old N'Kono was called as backup to Bell in the last minute of the 1994 edition's preparations, and did not play.

Coaching career
N'Kono served as assistant coach to the Cameroon national team, at the same time as being goalkeeping coach at former club Espanyol. In 2002, he was arrested by Malian police for allegedly using "black magic", prior to the African Cup of Nations semi-final against Mali (3–0 win). He was dragged onto the running track after stepping onto the pitch at the 26 March Stadium alongside coach Winfried Schäfer, and eventually received a one-year ban, which was then lifted, although he was not allowed to sit on the bench for the final; the former also received an apology from the office of the Malian president.

N'Kono, who was the national side's goalkeepers coach, also worked briefly as interim manager after German Otto Pfister resigned in protest. The following month, as Paul Le Guen took the reins of the team, he was reset in his old post.

Style of play
N'Kono was a tall, strong, dynamic and athletic goalkeeper, who was known in particular for his speed, agility, reactions, positioning, and ability to produce spectacular and acrobatic saves. One of his most notable characteristics was his ability to come out and punch the ball away with power when crosses were delivered into the area; his unique, instinctive and aggressive style inspired Gianluigi Buffon as a youngster. 

A commanding presence in goal, N'Kono also stood out for his composure, confidence and leadership throughout his career. In addition to his goalkeeping abilities, he was also known for his moustache and for wearing long trackpants instead of shorts; furthermore, he also had a penchant for performing flamboyant and acrobatic celebrations during matches. Unlike compatriot Bell, he preferred to position himself in deeper areas, rather than rushing out to sweep up the ball.

Legacy
Buffon declared that he decided to play in the goalkeeping position after seeing N'Kono's performances at the 1990 World Cup. In addition, he named his first son Louis Thomas in the Cameroonian's honour.

Honours
Canon Yaoundé
Elite One: 1974, 1977, 1979, 1980, 1982
CAF Champions League: 1978, 1980

Espanyol
UEFA Cup runner-up: 1987–88

Bolívar
Liga de Fútbol Profesional Boliviano: 1996, 1997

Cameroon
Africa Cup of Nations: 1984; Runner-up 1986

Individual
African Player of the Year: 1979, 1982
International Federation of Football History & Statistics All-time Africa Men's Dream Team: 2021

References

External links

Biography at CamLions 

1956 births
Living people
People from Littoral Region (Cameroon)
Cameroonian footballers
Association football goalkeepers
Canon Yaoundé players
Tonnerre Yaoundé players
La Liga players
Segunda División players
RCD Espanyol footballers
CE Sabadell FC footballers
CE L'Hospitalet players
Bolivian Primera División players
Club Bolívar players
Cameroon international footballers
1982 FIFA World Cup players
1990 FIFA World Cup players
1994 FIFA World Cup players
1982 African Cup of Nations players
1984 African Cup of Nations players
1986 African Cup of Nations players
1990 African Cup of Nations players
Africa Cup of Nations-winning players
Cameroonian expatriate footballers
Expatriate footballers in Spain
Expatriate footballers in Bolivia
Cameroonian expatriate sportspeople in Spain
Cameroonian expatriate sportspeople in Bolivia
African Footballer of the Year winners
Cameroonian football managers
Cameroon national football team managers
RCD Espanyol non-playing staff